is a passenger railway station in located in the city of Suzuka,  Mie Prefecture, Japan, operated by the private railway operator Kintetsu Railway.

Lines
Nagonoura Station is served by the Nagoya Line, and is located 45.6 rail kilometers from the starting point of the line at Kintetsu Nagoya Station.

Station layout
The station consists of two opposed side platforms, connected by a level crossing. The station is unattended.

Platforms

Adjacent stations

History
Naganoura Station opened on July 1, 1943 as a station on the Kansai Express Railway's Nagoya Line. This line was merged with the Nankai Electric Railway on June 1, 1944 to form Kintetsu. It replaced an earlier station of the same name on the Ise Railway, which had been closed in October 1928.

References

Passenger statistics
In fiscal 2019, the station was used by an average of 709 passengers daily (boarding passengers only).

Surrounding area
Suzuka fishing port
Suzuka City Chota Elementary School

See also
List of railway stations in Japan

References

External links

Kintetsu: Naganoura Station

Railway stations in Japan opened in 1943
Railway stations in Mie Prefecture
Stations of Kintetsu Railway
Suzuka, Mie